Shangnan County is a county in the east of Shaanxi province, China, bordering the provinces of Henan to the east and Hubei to the south.

Administrative divisions
Shangnan County has 1 subdistrict and 8 towns.
1 subdistrict
 Chengguan

8 towns
 Shiliping
 Qingyouhe
 Shima
 Guofenglou
 Zhaochuan
 Xianghe
 Fushui
 Qingshan

Climate

Transport
China National Highway 312

References

County-level divisions of Shaanxi
Shangluo